Rónán O'Connor is a Gaelic footballer and hurler who plays with Ballyduff. He has played Football and Hurling with Kerry and all levels, winning a Munster Minor Football Championship in 1998. He was captain of the Kerry football side in 2005. Also is the current Managing Director of O'Conner Marketing Specialising in customer acquisitions through B2B and B2C campaigns currently located in two countries Australia and England.

References

Year of birth missing (living people)
Living people
Ballyduff (Kerry) Gaelic footballers
Ballyduff (Kerry) hurlers
Dual players
Kerry inter-county Gaelic footballers
Kerry inter-county hurlers
Monaleen Gaelic footballers
Winners of one All-Ireland medal (Gaelic football)